The following is a list of notable past and present members of the Australian Club.



A
Hon Joseph Palmer Abbott OBE MC, Grazier and politician
Haynes Gibbes Alleyne, Medical practitioner.
Hon John Anderson (Australian politician) AO, Grazier and politician (deputy prime minister)
 Rt Hon Doug Anthony  Grazier and politician (deputy prime minister)
Hon Larry Anthony AO

B
Sir Samuel Henry Egerton Barraclough KBE VD, Engineer
Rt Hon Sir Edmund Barton GCMG QC, First Prime Minister of Australia and a founding justice of the High Court of Australia.
Rt Hon Sir Garfield Barwick GCMG AK, Attorney-General of Australia (1958–61), Minister for External Affairs (1961–64) and the seventh and longest serving Chief Justice of Australia (1964–81). He was appointed a Privy Counsellor in 1964 and a judge of the International Court of Justice (1973–74)[1]
Hon Sir Thomas Bavin KCMG, 24th Premier of New South Wales.
General Sir Phillip Bennett AC, KBE, DSO, KStJ
Lieutenant General Sir Frank Horton Berryman, KCVO, CB, CBE, DSO.
Lester Joseph Brain (1903–1980) aviator and aviation administrator
Hon Sir Gerard Brennan KBE AC QC
John Le Gay Brereton
Major-General Sir William Throsby Bridges KCB CMG, First Australian appointed to General rank, KIA Gallipoli
Sir Thomas Buckland, Goldmine-manager, pastoralist, businessman and philanthropist.
Hon Sir James Burns KCMG, Businessman, shipowner and philanthropist
Hon Sir William Westbrooke Burton KCMG, Politician and judge.

C
Robert Campbell, Landowner
Robert Campbell, Politician
Hon Sir John Carrick AC KCMG
Cardinal Edward Idris Cassidy AC
John Henry Challis, Benefactor University of Sydney
General Sir Harry Chauvel GCMG, KCB
David S. Clarke AO, Chairman Macquarie Bank.
Hon Terence Cole AO QC
General The Hon Sir Peter Cosgrove AK MC CNZM
Sir Bob Cotton KCMG AO
Sir Charles Cowper, KCMG, Premier of NSW
Sir Norman Lethbridge Cowper
James Charles Cox (1834–1912) medical practitioner
Major-General Paul Alfred Cullen AC CBE DSO ED, Soldier and Grazier.
Sir Arthur Roden Cutler VC, AK, KCVO, CBE

D
William John Dakin, Zoologist
Lieutenant General Sir Thomas Joseph Daly KBE, CB, DSO
Rt Hon Sir William Bede Dalley QC, Attorney-General of NSW
Frederick Matthew Darley GCMG, Chief Justice & lieutenant-governor of New South Wales.
Sir James Ralph Darling OBE, Headmaster Geelong Grammar School.
Hon Sir John Bayley Darvall KCMG QC, Attorney-general of NSW
Hon Sir William Deane AC, KBE, KStJ, QC, Australian judge and 22nd Governor-General of Australia.
Peter Debnam MP
Hon Sir George Dibbs KCMG, Three times Premier of NSW
Rt Hon Sir Owen Dixon OM GCMG KBE, Australian judge and diplomat, was the sixth Chief Justice of Australia.
Sir Stuart Donaldson 
Sir Talbot Duckmanton CBE. Australian broadcaster and General Manager of the Australian Broadcasting Commission, former Chairman of Newington College Council 1968-1973
Sir Walter Gordon Duncan (1885–1963) pastoralist and politician in SA
Lieutenant General Sir Donald Dunstan AC, KBE, CB (born 18 February 1923) is a former Australian Army officer, who was Governor of South Australia from 1982 to 1991.
Donald J. Dwyer, former Chairman of Newington College Council 1994-2000

E
Malcolm Henry Ellis, Journalist and historian,

F
James Fairfax AO
Sir Warwick Oswald Fairfax
Charles Brunsdon Fletcher, Editor Sydney Morning Herald (1918–1937)
Sir Francis Forbes
Hon Sir George Warburton Fuller KCMG, Barrister and politician.
Sir Hudson Fysh KBE, DFC, Aviator and businessman.

G
Rt Hon Sir Harry Gibbs AK GCMG KBE, Chief Justice of Australia
David Gonski AC, businessman and arts patron.
William Deuchar Gordon, grazier and president of the club.
Sir Albert John Gould VD, lawyer and politician.
Hon Justice Peter Graham, Federal court judge.
Sir Norman McAlister Gregg MC, ophthalmologist who discovered Congenital Rubella Syndrome.
Hon Justice William Gummow AC, Justice High Court of Australia.

H
Jack Hannes Businessman, founder of HANIMEX
Hon Sir John Hay KCMG
Sir Samuel Hordern KBE
Air Chief Marshal Angus Houston AC AFC
Hon John Howard AC, Prime Minister of Australia (1996–2007)
Admiral Michael Wyndham Hudson AC
Hon Tom Hughes AO QC
Hon Justice Sir Percival Halse Rogers KBE, Judge
Dr Timothy Hawkes OAM, former Headmaster of The King's School, Parramatta

J
Sir George Alfred Julius (1873–1946) mechanical engineer and inventor
Alan Jackson AO FCA (1936-2018), Businessman and corporate executive.

K
Hon Norman William Kater
Sir Norman William Kater, Medical practitioner, grazier and politician.
Stephen Lackey Kessell (1897–1979) forester and administrator
Philip Gidley King (1817-1904) pastoralist and politician.
Phillip Parker King, Naval officer, hydrographer and company manager.
David Kirk MBE, Rugby World Cup winning captain of New Zealand and former CEO of John Fairfax
Rt Hon Sir Frank Kitto AC, KBE, KC
Frederick Percival Kneeshaw (1883–1955) engineer and company director
Rt Hon Sir Adrian Knox KCMG QC, Second Chief Justice of the High Court of Australia.

L
Lieutenant General Peter Leahy AC is a former Chief of the Australian Army.
George Le Couteur OBE, company director.
Sir Charles Lloyd Jones, Chairman David Jones Limited
Hon Jim Longley
Robert Lowe, 1st Viscount Sherbrooke, British and Australian statesman; served in William Ewart Gladstone's cabinet as Chancellor of the exchequer 1868–1873.

M
Hon Hannibal Hawkins Macarthur Australian colonist, politician, businessman and wool pioneer.
Hon Sir William Macarthur, Pastoralist
Major-General Sir Denzil Macarthur-Onslow CBE DSO ED
Major General Hon James Macarthur-Onslow VD Soldier, grazier and politician.
Professor Sir Mungo William MacCallum KCMG, Educationist, scholar and administrator.
Hugh Mackay
Sir Charles Mackellar, surgeon and M.P.
Hon Michael MacKellar
Brigadier-General Henry Normand MacLaurin
Sir Normand MacLaurin, Physician, company director and university administrator.
Hon Sir Alexander Macleay MLC FLS FRS, Colonial secretary NSW.
Sir George Macleay KCMG, Explorer and Politician.
William Sharp Macleay FRS, Entomologist.
Sir Herbert Lethington Maitland, Surgeon and sportsman.
Sir William Montagu Manning KCMG
Conrad Martens
Rear-Admiral Sir David Martin KCMG AO, Governor of NSW
Hon Sir James Martin KCB QC, Three times Premier of New South Wales, and Chief Justice of the Supreme Court of New South Wales.
Sir David Maughan QC, Barrister.
John McCallum AC, CBE, Actor.
Samuel McCaughey (1892–1955) grazier
Rt Hon Sir William McMahon CH GCMG
Sir William McMillan , Merchant and politician,
Hon Roderick Meagher AO QC
Francis Lewis Shaw Merewether, Public servant and university chancellor.
Sir Denison Samuel King Miller KCMG, Banker governor of the Commonwealth Bank.
Jim Milner, Former President of the NRMA and Chairman of Washington H. Soul Pattinson
David Scott Mitchell, Founder of the Mitchell library, Sydney, Australia.
Thomas Mitchell, Surveyor and explorer of south-eastern Australia.
Max Moore-Wilton AC
Hugh Morgan AC
Sir William Morrow, DSO ED.
Lieutenant General Sir Leslie James Morshead KCB, KBE, CMG, DSO, ED
Thomas Sutcliffe Mort
Allan Moss AO, Former Managing Director/CEO of Macquarie Bank
Sir Rupert Myers KBE, Vice chancellor, University of NSW.

N
Sir Charles Nicholson Bt, Founder of University of Sydney and Australia's first Baronet
Lieutenant General Sir John Northcott KCMG KCVO CB

O
Richard Edward O'Connor, Foundation Justice of the High Court of Australia
Arthur Alexander Walton Onslow, Naval officer and politician.
Sir Alexander Campbell Onslow, Judge.
Rt Hon Sir William Francis Langer Owen KBE, Judge of the Supreme Court of New South Wales and of the High Court of Australia.
Sir William Owen, Royal commissioner and Chief Judge in Equity of the Supreme Court of New South Wales.

P
Hon Clyde Packer
Sir Frank Packer 
James Packer AM
Kerry Packer AC
Rt Hon Sir Earle Page GCMG CH
Banjo Paterson CBE
Hon Andrew Peacock AC
Professor Sir John Beverley Peden KCMG, barrister and professor of law
Cardinal George Pell AC
Brigadier Hon Thomas Alfred John Playfair DSO OBE VD MLC, Meat exporter, soldier and politician.

R
Rt Hon Sir George Edward Rich KCMG, Justice of High Court of Australia
Hon Justice Bernard Blomfield Riley, Federal Court Judge
Sir Alfred Roberts KCMG, surgeon
Sir Stephen Henry Roberts CMG, Historian and university vice-chancellor
Joseph Phelps Robinson (1815–1848) banker and landowner
Hon William Robson MLC, NSW parliamentarian
Christopher Rolleston CMG
Air Marshal Sir James Rowland AC, KBE, DFC, AFC, Governor of NSW
George Alfred Russell (1839–1926), insurance executive

S
Gordon Samuels, AC, CVO, QC, KStJ,
Hon Justice Kim Santow AC
Paul D. Scully-Power AM
Hon Sir John See KCMG, Premier of New South Wales.
Sir Nicholas Shehadie, AC, OBE, former Lord Mayor of Sydney (1973–1975) and ex-Captain in the Australia national rugby union team.
Sir Colin Sinclair KBE
Rt Hon Ian Sinclair AC.
Robert Burdett Smith (1837–1895) solicitor and politician
Hon Warwick Smith AM
Rt Hon Sir Alfred Stephen GCMG CB
Hon Justice Sir Matthew Henry Stephen, Puisne judge of the supreme court of New South Wales.
Sir Bertram Stevens KCMG, Premier of New South Wales from 16 May 1932 to 5 August 1939.
Hon Sir Francis Bathurst Suttor,
Sir Thomas Peter Anderson Stuart KCMG, Professor of physiology and medical administrator.

T
The Hon. Angus Talbot, former Chairman of Newington College Council 2007-2013
Sir Edward Deas Thomson KCMG CB
Robert Towns, Businessman and founder of Townsville.
Dr Ralph Townsend, Headmaster Winchester College, formerly Oundle and Sydney Grammar School.
Malcolm Turnbull, MP, former Prime Minister of Australia

V
Walter Liberty Vernon VD, Architect and soldier.

W
Hon Thomas Waddell, Premier of New South Wales
Hon Sir Charles Gregory Wade KCMG KC, Premier of New South Wales
Sir Samuel Robert Walder, (1879–1946), Businessman and politician (Lord Mayor of Sydney)
William Wilkinson Wardell (1823–1899) architect and civil servant
Hon William Wentworth, Explorer & Founder University of Sydney
Morris West AM
A B Weigall CMG
Hunter White
Richard Windeyer KC
Major-General Rt Hon Sir Victor Windeyer KBE CB DSO KC, Australian judge, soldier and educator, was a Justice of the High Court of Australia
Sir William Charles Windeyer
John Woolley
Hon Mr Justice Edward Wise
James Wolfensohn AO KBE
Lieutenant General Sir Eric Woodward KCMG, KCVO, CB, CBE, DSO, Governor of New South Wales from 1 August 1957 to 1 August 1965

References

A History of the Australian Club 1838–1888, DR J R Angel
Who's Who in Australia 1941
Who's Who in Australia 1950
Who's Who in Australia 1974
Who's Who in Australia 2007
John's Notable Australians 1900

Australian Club